Balasaheb Pawar  is an Indian politician. He was elected to the Lok Sabha, the lower house of the Parliament of India as a member of the Indian National Congress.

References

External links
Official biographical sketch in Parliament of India website

India MPs 1980–1984
India MPs 1984–1989
Lok Sabha members from Maharashtra
1932 births
Living people